Jenning Huizenga (born 29 March 1984, in Franeker) is a Dutch professional racing cyclist.

In 2014, Huizenga will compete with the Parkhotel Valkenburg Continental Team.

Career highlights

2004
 3rd, Lippe Lap Drachten A-Zeven Classic (NED)
2005
 2nd, Rheda-Wiedenbrück, Derny (GER)
2006
 3rd, National Track Championships, Pursuit, Elite, The Netherlands, Alkmaar (NED)
2007
 3rd, Beijing World Cup, Team Pursuit
 1st, National Track Championships, Pursuit, Elite, The Netherlands, Alkmaar (NED)
2008
 2nd, Los Angeles World Cup, Pursuit
 2nd, UCI Track Cycling World Championships, Individual pursuit
2011
National Track Championships
1st Individual pursuit
2nd Scratch
2012
National Track Championships
1st Individual pursuit
2nd Scratch
1st, Stage 2, Olympia's Tour
2013
3rd European Track Championships, Team pursuit
National record, Manchester Track World Cup, Team pursuit (3:03.033)

See also
 List of Dutch Olympic cyclists

External links

1984 births
Living people
Dutch male cyclists
Cyclists at the 2008 Summer Olympics
Cyclists at the 2012 Summer Olympics
Olympic cyclists of the Netherlands
People from Franekeradeel
Dutch cyclists at the UCI Track Cycling World Championships
Cyclists from Friesland